Patty Wong (born October 29, 1980, in Lima, Peru) is a Peruvian model. She formerly co-hosted a popular youth-oriented Peruvian show called R con R. She also won in "Miss Perú Tusan," a beauty contest for Peruvian-Chinese girls, like her. She also co-hosts a Peruvian television show in the singing talent contest format, called Camino a la fama. She was also the host of the cancelled children's show Zoombate along with Cati Caballero as co-host, another famous Peruvian model that started her career in R con R.

References

External links
 Information and Photos

People from Lima
Peruvian women in business
Peruvian people of Chinese descent
Peruvian television presenters
Peruvian female models
1980 births
Living people
Peruvian women television presenters